This article lists the Social Democratic Party (UK)'s election results in UK parliamentary elections.

Summary of general election performance

By-elections, 1981-1983

1983 general election

References

E